Gundruk is a fermented leafy green vegetable originated in Nepal. Alongside Nepal, it is also popular in Gorkhali or Nepalese diaspora households in India, Bhutan, Myanmar and other parts of the world. The annual production of gundruk in Nepal is estimated at 2,000 tons and most of the production is carried out at the household level. 

Gundruk is obtained from the fermentation of leafy vegetables (saag). It is served as a side dish with the main meal and is also used as an appetizer. Gundruk is an important source of minerals, particularly during the off-season when the diet consists of mostly starchy tubers and maize, which tend to be low in minerals.

Raw material preparation
In the months of October and November, during the harvest of the first broad mustard, mustard green, radish and cauliflower leaves, large quantities of leaves accumulate — much more than can be consumed fresh. These leaves are allowed to wilt for one or two days and are then shredded with a knife or sickle.

Not only the leaves of the radish but also the roots are used to make a better quality gundruk. The roots of the radish can be mixed with the leaves and smashed together. When it is smashed, care should be taken not to make the pieces too small. In the mountainous regions of the central part of Nepal, the smashed radish and leaves are put into an earthenware container, compressed, and the mouth of container is closed tightly. 

It is then buried in a safe and sunny place. It may be placed in an open place. After a few days, the acidity can be tasted, or this can be gauged from its smell. It is then dried in sunlight. Gundruk prepared in this manner is more tasty, more flavorsome and more acidic.

Processing
The shredded leaves are tightly packed in an earthenware pot, and warm water (at about 30 °C) is added to cover all the leaves. The pot is then kept in a warm place. After a week, a mild acidic taste indicates the end of fermentation and the Gundruk is removed and dried in the sun. This process is similar to sauerkraut or kimchi production except that no salt is added to the shredded leaves before the start of gundruk fermentation. 

The ambient temperature at the time of fermentation is about 18 °C. Pediococcus and Lactobacillus species are the predominant microorganisms active during Gundruk fermentation. During fermentation, the pH drops slowly to a final value of 4.0 and the amount of acid (as lactic) increases to about 1% on the sixth day. 

It has been found that a disadvantage with the traditional process of Gundruk fermentation is the loss of 90% of the carotenoids, probably during sun-drying. Improved methods of drying might reduce the vitamin loss.

See also
Sinki 
Masaura
Kinema

References

External links
Gundruk - technical brief from Practical Action 
Gundruk 

Nepalese cuisine
Nepalese curries
Fermented foods